Cerautola semibrunnea, the semibrown epitola, is a butterfly in the family Lycaenidae. It is found in Nigeria, Cameroon, the Central African Republic, the Democratic Republic of the Congo, Uganda and Tanzania. Its habitat consists of forests.

Subspecies
Cerautola semibrunnea semibrunnea (Nigeria: Cross River loop, Cameroon, Central African Republic, Democratic Republic of the Congo, Uganda)
Cerautola semibrunnea bamptoni Libert & Collins, 1999 (north-western Tanzania)

References

Butterflies described in 1916
Poritiinae
Butterflies of Africa
Taxa named by George Thomas Bethune-Baker